Hmar Zothanchhunga (born 26 December 1985) is an Indian cricketer. He made his first-class debut for Mizoram in the 2018–19 Ranji Trophy on 14 December 2018. He made his Twenty20 debut on 11 January 2021, for Mizoram in the 2020–21 Syed Mushtaq Ali Trophy.

References

External links
 

1985 births
Living people
Indian cricketers
Mizoram cricketers
Place of birth missing (living people)